Dust Bowl Cimarron County, Oklahoma is an iconic 1936 photograph of the Dust Bowl taken by 21-year-old Arthur Rothstein, a photographer for the federal Farm Security Administration, while he was driving through Cimarron County, Oklahoma. The photo shows a farmer and his two sons running from the dust to a dilapidated shed past fence posts nearly submerged in dust. While passing through Oklahoma Rothstein spotted the farmer Arthur Coble (1896-1956), a native of Sailor Springs, Illinois, and his two young sons, Milton Garth Coble (1930-1973) and Darrel Arthur Coble (1933-1979), and photographed them on their farm near Felt, Oklahoma. The original caption simply stated "Farmer and Sons Walking in the Face of a Dust Storm, Cimarron County, Oklahoma, April 1936.” Some claim the scene was reenacted or staged, but the Cobles affirmed that it was not, and it remains one of the most emblematic images of the struggles endured during Dust Bowl and Great Depression.

References

1930s photographs
1936 in art
1936 works
Black-and-white photographs
Dust Bowl
Great Depression in the United States
Photographs of the United States